Robert Christopher Sarvis (born September 15, 1976) is an American attorney. While attending law school, he was the co-founder and editor-in-chief of the NYU Journal of Law & Liberty; he also clerked for Judge E. Grady Jolly on the U.S. Court of Appeals for the Fifth Circuit. In addition, he has been a software developer, being named by Google as a Grand Prize Winner for their Android Development challenge.

In 2011, he ran for the Virginia Senate as a Republican, losing to Democrat Dick Saslaw; after the election, Sarvis switched to the Libertarian Party. He was the Libertarian Party of Virginia's nominee for Governor of Virginia in the 2013 election, finishing third behind Democrat Terry McAuliffe and Republican Ken Cuccinelli, and he was the nominee for the U.S. Senate in the 2014 midterm election.

Early life and education
Sarvis was born on September 15, 1976 in Fairfax, Virginia to a father of English and Irish descent and a mother of Chinese descent. Growing up in West Springfield, he attended Thomas Jefferson High School for Science and Technology, a public magnet school and one of Virginia's "Governor's schools". In his senior year at Thomas Jefferson, Sarvis placed fourth in the 1994 Westinghouse Science Talent Search for a theoretical math project studying lattices, winning a $15,000 scholarship. Upon graduating from high school, Sarvis attended Harvard University, pursuing a bachelor's degree in mathematics and graduated in 1998. He won a Harvard College Scholarship, reserved for the top 10% of a class.

Sarvis earned a Master of Advanced Studies degree in mathematics from the University of Cambridge in England (the University of Cambridge began offering the master of advanced study in 2010 as a one-year master's degree in Mathematics as a replacement for the "Part  III exam in Mathematics"). He briefly enrolled in a doctorate program at the University of California, Berkeley, leaving to join a Silicon Valley-based technology start-up as a software developer.

In 2002, Sarvis enrolled at the New York University School of Law, graduating with a J.D. in 2005. During his time at NYU, Sarvis co-founded and became editor-in-chief of the NYU Journal of Law & Liberty, a student-run, conservative-libertarian law review. He was a member of the Federalist Society while at NYU.

Sarvis earned a Master's degree in economics from George Mason University in Fairfax, Virginia.

Sarvis is also a Searle Freedom Trust Fellow and served as a fellow at George Mason's Mercatus Center for research. His teaching careers also include time as a teaching fellow in the Harvard math department, a course assistant for calculus at UC Berkeley as well as an algebra teacher at Western Career College, now known as Carrington College California.

Professional life

Legal career
Upon graduating from law school, Sarvis began clerking for Judge E. Grady Jolly on the 5th Circuit Court of Appeals in Jackson, Mississippi. After his clerkship, he became an Associate Attorney for global law firm Gibson, Dunn & Crutcher. Sarvis has also held Summer Associate positions at law firms such as Kirkland & Ellis and Fish & Neave. In 2006, Sarvis penned a 40-page article in the University of New Hampshire's Pierce Law Review expressing concern over congressional delegation of legislative responsibilities to the executive branch, and support for increased formalism in separation of powers.

Sarvis is a member of the New York State Bar and DC Bar.

Software career
In 2008, Sarvis left his position at Gibson, Dunn & Crutcher to resume work in the software development business – which he had worked in between his time at Berkeley and his time in law school. Along with several others, he founded the company Wertago, to develop apps for Google's Android operating system. The Wertago development team entered in Google's 2008 Android developer challenge, creating software billed to connect friends during the night and search for parties and gatherings. Wertago was one of Google's top-50 grand prize winners, receiving $275,000 as a team in addition to $25,000 for each member of the development project.

Political career

Political positions
Sarvis supports universal school choice, drug policy reform, right-to-work laws, and gun rights. Sarvis supports same-sex marriage. Sarvis opposed the controversial Virginia H.B. 2313, which was signed into law by Virginia Governor Bob McDonnell; the bill increased the sales tax to fund transportation infrastructure.  Sarvis supported more transportation user fees instead. Sarvis opposes Medicaid expansion, and supports abolition of the car tax and occupational license tax, Sarvis also called for an end to "the increasing aggressiveness of law enforcement tactics" citing an incident involving Virginia ABC agents and a group of University of Virginia students. Sarvis proposed shifting responsibility for policing liquor sales from ABC to state and local police, and supported privatization of liquor sales in Virginia (which has had a state monopoly on liquor sales for 80 years).

Virginia State Senate campaign, 2011
In 2011, Sarvis ran unopposed for the Republican nomination for State Senate in the heavily Democratic-leaning Virginia's 35th district. In the general election in November, he lost to  Democrat Dick Saslaw, then the Senate Majority Leader, 62% to 36%. Sarvis was outspent by his opponent Saslaw $1,897,061 to $26,402.

Shortly after attending the 2012 Young Republican Federation of Virginia Biennial Convention as a delegate, Sarvis left the Republican Party, saying that "I realized that the Republican Party, at least in Virginia, in the current era, is not a good vehicle for liberty candidates. Republicans are very strident on personal issues. When they talk about liberty, they don't mean any personal issues, there is very little respect for personal autonomy."

Virginia gubernatorial campaign, 2013

In 2013, Sarvis was nominated by the Libertarian Party of Virginia as the party's gubernatorial candidate. His campaign secured sufficient signatures to get him on the ballot, and he became the fourth minor party nominee in forty years to get on the Virginiastatewide  ballot.

Sarvis ran against Republican Ken Cuccinelli and Democrat Terry McAuliffe in the race. Sarvis was not invited to the debates with Cuccinelli and the McAuliffe, even though some Virginia newspapers and others called for his inclusion.

Opinion polls of Virginia voters found that Sarvis's support drew about equally from the Republican and Democratic-leaning voters. He polled from 7% to 14% in various polls.

In August 2013, Sarvis was endorsed by former Republican-turned-Libertarian governor of New Mexico Gary Johnson, However, former Republican U.S. Representative Ron Paul, a libertarian figure, endorsed Cuccinelli.

Sarvis debuted his first televised campaign ad during the showing of the NBC4 debate in September 2013. Near the end of the campaign, Purple PAC, a Libertarian-leaning super PAC, launched a six-figure television ad buy designed to boost the Sarvis campaign before election day; the ad first aired during the televised Virginia Tech debate on October 24, 2013.

Sarvis obtained 146,084 votes (6.5%), which was wider than McAuliffe's victory margin over Cuccinelli. Sarvis outperformed other Libertarian Party candidates, such as presidential candidate Gary Johnson, marking a record performance among Libertarian candidates in a gubernatorial elections.

Campaign finance controversy
According to campaign finance reporting, Sarvis received $222,127. The bulk of contributions primarily came from individual donations; Sarvis was the largest single financial contributor to his own campaign at $21,057.

On election day, some conservative sites claimed that Sarvis' campaign was partly financed by software billionaire Joe Liemandt. Liemandt, founder of the software company Trilogy and an Obama campaign contributor, was the largest single contributor to the Libertarian Booster PAC. The Libertarian Booster PAC contributed $11,454 to Sarvis' campaign, or approximately 5% of Sarvis' total contributions, to help Sarvis achieve ballot access.

Two days after the election, Wes Benedict, who founded the Libertarian Booster PAC and was the executive director for the Libertarian Natitonal Committee, released a statement countering Limbaugh's accusations, said Limbaugh's comment was an "outright lie" and called upon Limbaugh to retract the allegations. In an interview with U.S. News & World Report, Sarvis denied Limbaugh's accusations against him, saying they were false and part of a GOP "smear campaign." Sarvis also noted that many of the direct donors to his campaign had given to Republicans in the past.

U.S. Senate campaign, 2014

In 2014, Sarvis announced his candidacy for the U.S. Senate seat against the incumbent, Mark Warner, a Democrat who ran for re-election, and Republican Ed Gillespie. He received the Libertarian Party of Virginia.

Sarvis qualified for the ballot via ballot collection; he contended that the ballot-qualification process was "designed to be long and arduous, to minimize competition" against the major parties.

Our America PAC and former Governor of New Mexico and 2012 Libertarian Party presidential nominee Gary Johnson. He was also supported by former Republican activist Caleb Coulter.

During his campaign, Sarvis criticized Warner for voting in favor of a campaign finance reform amendment to the U.S. Constitution to overturn the Citizens United v. FEC case, and criticized Gillespie's record as chairman of the Republican National Committee and as a Bush-era official. Sarvis also called for congressional authorization for U.S. military action against ISIL. In addition, Sarvis discussed topics including the national debt, foreign policy, national surveillance issues, the Affordable Care Act, transportation and energy issues, and immigration.

Sarvis was accused by both Republicans and Democrats of being secretly funded by the other side. In response, Sarvis asserted that he was not a "plant."

Sarvis sought to be included to debates against Warner and Gillespie, but was not invited to the debates.

In the general election, Sarvis received 53,021 of the 2,181,845 votes cast, or 2.4%, about 3 times the margin separating Warner and Gillespie.

Election history

References

External links
 
 Robert C. Sarvis at the Virginia Public Access Project

|-

1976 births
Living people
21st-century American politicians
Alumni of the University of Cambridge
American gun rights activists
American people of Chinese descent
American people of English descent
American people of Irish descent
Businesspeople from Virginia
Candidates in the 2013 United States elections
Candidates in the 2014 United States elections
George Mason University alumni
George Mason University faculty
George Mason University fellows
Harvard College alumni
New York University School of Law alumni
People associated with Gibson Dunn
People associated with Kirkland & Ellis
People from Annandale, Virginia
People from West Springfield, Virginia
Politicians from Fairfax, Virginia
Thomas Jefferson High School for Science and Technology alumni
Virginia lawyers
Virginia Libertarians
Virginia Republicans